James or Jim Holt may refer to:

 James Holt (MP) (1647–1713), English MP for Lancashire
 James Maden Holt (1829–1911), English Conservative Party politician, MP for North East Lancashire 1868–1880
 James Holt (American football) (born 1986), American gridiron player
 Jim Holt (philosopher), American philosopher, author and essayist
 James Holt (scholar), British Latter-day Saint scholar
 James Holt (historian) (1922–2014), British professor of mediaeval history
 James Richard Holt (1931–1991), British politician
 Jim Holt (actor) (born 1959), British/Australian actor
 Jim Holt (baseball) (1944–2019), American baseball player
 Jim Holt (Arkansas politician) (born 1965), Arkansas politician

See also (similar names)
James Holt Clanton (1827–1871), American soldier, lawyer, and legislator
James Holt Marsh (1866–1928), British rugby union player
Jim Holton (1951–1993), British soccer player